The Social Democratic Party was a political party in Thailand, which emerged during the 1950s. The party was led Suthep Sutchakhun. The party called for economic justice, on the basis of political democracy. Suthep sought to combine Buddhist and Christian ideas, and the party was void of Marxist influence and did not elaborate on theories of class.

References

Defunct political parties in Thailand
Social democratic parties
Political parties established in the 1950s
1950s establishments in Thailand